Wolfgang Thüne (born 8 October 1949) is a German former gymnast. He competed at the 1972 Summer Olympics in all artistic gymnastics events and won a bronze medal with the East German team. Individually his best achievement was seventh place in the horizontal bar. He won two more bronze team medals at the world championships in 1970 and 1974 as well as individual silver in the horizontal bar in 1974. At the 1975 European championships in Bern, he fled to West Germany with the help of his rival Eberhard Gienger. In 1977 he won the national all-round title in West Germany competing for TuS 04 Leverkusen. After retirement he worked as a gymnastics coach at the same club.

References

1949 births
People from Heilbad Heiligenstadt
Living people
German male artistic gymnasts
Olympic gymnasts of East Germany
Gymnasts at the 1972 Summer Olympics
Olympic bronze medalists for East Germany
Olympic medalists in gymnastics
Sportspeople from Thuringia
Medalists at the 1972 Summer Olympics
Medalists at the World Artistic Gymnastics Championships